Khem Sambo was a Cambodian journalist. He wrote for the opposition Khmer-language daily journal Moneaseka Khmer and was affiliated with the Sam Rainsy Party. Sambo was one of the publication’s most outspoken reporters.

Work 
He criticized the government's corruption and illegal land-grabbing. He reported on topics such as the problematic distribution of benefits from Chinese investment in the country, and corruption under the Hun Sen government.

Death 
On July 11, 2008, he was shot twice while riding his motorcycle with his 21-year-old son in Phnom Penh. He died in the hospital along with his son. The murder occurred during the campaign preceding the July 27 general elections.

On July 14, the Committee to Protect Journalists (CPJ) condemned the murders and called upon Cambodian Prime Minister Hun Sen to launch an independent investigation about the killing.  The CPJ was of the view that Sambo may have been killed in reprisal for his reporting on government corruption, and that the attack was meant to intimidate journalists and the public.

References

External links 

 Committee to Protect Journalists: Khem Sambo
 

1961 births
2011 deaths
Cambodian journalists
Murdered journalists